The provinces of Italy are the second-level administrative divisions of the Italian Republic, on an intermediate level between a municipality and a region. Since 2015, provinces have been classified as "institutional bodies of second level".

There are currently 107 institutional bodies of second level in Italy, including 80 ordinary provinces, 2 autonomous provinces, 4 regional decentralization entities, 6 free municipal consortia, and 14 metropolitan cities, as well as the Aosta Valley region (which also exercises the powers of a province).

Italian provinces (with the exception of the current Sardinian provinces) correspond to the NUTS 3 regions.

Overview
A province of the Italian Republic is composed of many municipalities. Usually several provinces together form a region; the region of Aosta Valley is the sole exception—it is not subdivided into provinces, and provincial functions are exercised by the region.

The three main functions devolved to provinces are:

 local planning and zoning;
 provision of local police and fire services;
 transportation regulation (car registration, maintenance of local roads, etc.).

The number of provinces in Italy has been steadily growing in recent years, as many new ones are carved out of older ones. Usually, the province's name is the same as that of its capital city.

According to the 2014 reform, each province is headed by a President (or Commissioner) assisted by a legislative body, the Provincial Council, and an executive body, the Provincial Executive. President (Commissioner) and members of Council are elected together by mayors and city councilors of each municipality of the province. The Executive is chaired by the President (Commissioner) who appoint others members, called . Since 2015, the President (Commissioner) and other members of the council will not receive a salary.

In each province, there is also a Prefect, a representative of the central government who heads an agency called . The Questor is the head of State Police in the province and his office is called . There is also a provincial police force depending from local government, called provincial police.

The South Tyrol and Trentino are autonomous provinces: unlike all other provinces they have the same legislative powers as regions and are not subordinated to Trentino-Alto Adige/Südtirol, the region they are part of.

Type
Based on the most recent legislation, contained in the law of 7 April 2014 n. 56, the council and the presidents of the provinces of the regions with ordinary statute are elected by restricted suffrage by the mayors and councilors of the province's municipalities, while in the metropolitan cities the equivalent of the president of the province is the (elective) mayor of the capital, said "metropolitan mayor".

The other types of entities similar to the provinces in the regions with special statutes, the free municipal consortia in Sicily and the Sardinian provinces are governed by extraordinary commissioners appointed by the respective regional administrations, the autonomous provinces of Trentino-Alto Adige each elect its own president, and finally in Aosta Valley the functions of the province are carried out by the regional administration (whose president is elected by the regional council).

List of provinces

List 
Note: the data is updated as of 1 January 2021

Data 

 Sardinia — following the outcome of the regional referendums of 2012 it was decreed that such institutions should be reformed or abolished by March 2013 (thus remaining in office until 28 February 2013). In January 2014 the Sardinian Regional Administrative Court declared "unconstitutional" the abolition of the Sardinian provinces, which occurred in 2013. In 2016, Sardinian provinces were reformed by Sardinia regional executive: Cagliari became a metropolitan city; the provinces Olbia-Tempio, Ogliastra, Medio Campidano and Carbonia-Iglesias were abolished. In 2017, Regional council of Sardinia approved the institution of a new province, South Sardinia. It was formed by the municipalities of province of Cagliari that did not join to metropolitan city of Cagliari, and those which formed the provinces of Medio Campidano and Carbonia Iglesias.
 Sicily — provinces were replaced by six free municipal consortia in 2013 and three metropolitan cities in 2015.
 Friuli-Venezia Giulia — in 2016, the regional council of Friuli-Venezia Giulia approved a law which abolished the four provinces that formed the region, and replaced them by 18 territorial unions of municipalities. In 2019, the regional council of Friuli-Venezia Giulia rebranded the four provinces as the four regional decentralization entities, with their own competences, powers, and capital.
 Metropolitan cities — in 2015, 14 metropolitan cities replaced the provinces of Bari, Bologna, Cagliari, Catania, Florence, Genoa, Messina, Milan, Naples, Palermo, Reggio Calabria, Rome, Turin, and Venice.

Maps

History

National unification
In 1861, at the birth of the Kingdom of Italy, there were 59 provinces. However, at that time the national territory was smaller than the current one: regions of Veneto, Friuli-Venezia Giulia, Trentino-Alto Adige/Südtirol and Lazio were not included in the kingdom.

In 1866, following the Third Independence War, territories of Veneto, Friuli and Mantua were annexed. There were therefore nine more provinces: Belluno, Mantua, Padua, Rovigo, Treviso, Venice, Verona, Vicenza and Udine, all previously part of the Austrian Empire. Eventually, in 1870, following the union of Rome and its province from the Papal States, the provinces rose in number to 69.

After the World War I, new territories were annexed to Italy. The province of Trento was created in 1923. Provinces of La Spezia and Trieste in 1923, while Ionio in 1924. 
In 1924 the new provinces of Fiume, Pola, and Zara were created, increasing the total number of provinces in Italy to 76.

Between the two World Wars

In 1927, following a Royal charter, a general province rearrangement took place. 17 new provinces were created: Aosta, Vercelli, Varese, Savona, Bolzano, Gorizia, Pistoia, Pescara, Rieti, Terni, Viterbo, Frosinone, Brindisi, Matera, Ragusa, Castrogiovanni, Nuoro.  In the same year, the Province of Caserta was dissolved, Girgenti was renamed Agrigento, and the institution of circondari, sub-provincial wards created before the unification, was abolished.

In 1930 Spezia became La Spezia, while in 1931 Bari delle Puglie became Bari.  Province of Littoria (Latina) was created in 1934, and the Province of Asti in 1935.  n 1939 the Province of Aquila degli Abruzzi became the Province of L'Aquila, and in 1940 the Province of Friuli was renamed the Province of Udine.

Following the annexation of a part of Yugoslavia in 1941, during the World War II, the province of Zara was enlarged and joined the Governorate of Dalmatia (comprising the province of Zara, and the new provinces of Spalato, and Cattaro), while in the occupied central part of the present-day Slovenia the new province of Ljubljana was created. This lasted only until 1945, when Yugoslavia regained the lost territories after the end of the World War II.

After World War II
In 1945, after the end of the World War II, the province of Aosta changed its name to Aosta Valley and Littoria to Latina; the new province of Caserta was recreated.

With the Paris Peace Treaties, signed on 10 February 1947, Italy lost the provinces of Fiume, Pola and Zara, and part of the provinces of Trieste and Gorizia. 

Moreover, the province of Trieste was occupied by United States and British forces. The Italian Republic therefore had 91 provinces at its birth. The province of Ionio was renamed as Taranto in 1951, and in 1954 the province of Trieste was returned to Italy.

Recent history
The Province of Pordenone was created in 1968, the province of Isernia in 1970, and the Province of Oristano in 1974.
In a reorganization in 1992 eight provinces were created: Verbano-Cusio-Ossola, Biella, Lecco, Lodi, Rimini, Prato, Crotone, and Vibo Valentia, while Forlì was renamed as Forlì-Cesena.

Four new provinces were created in Sardinia in 2001, with effect from 2005: Olbia-Tempio, Ogliastra, Medio Campidano and Carbonia-Iglesias. In 2004 three further provinces were created: Monza and Brianza, Fermo, and Barletta-Andria-Trani, making a total of 110 provinces.

In May 2012, a referendum abolished the eight provinces of Sardinia, and this suppression was to take effect on 1 March 2013. On 6 July 2012, new plans were published to reduce the number of provinces by around half. In January 2014 the Sardinian Regional Administrative Court declared "unconstitutional" the abolition of the Sardinian provinces, which occurred in 2013.

In 2014 the Delrio Law transformed the Provinces of Italy in a reduced number of broader administrative entities.

In 2014 the Friuli Venezia Giulia of Debora Serracchiani was the first Italian region to pass a law for abolishing its provinces, while implementing the national reform in the local administrative level. The Friuli region has multiplied four provinces in 18 unions of the Italian administrative unit called Comune. After rejection of the 2016 Italian constitutional referendum, the Provinces of Italy were still kept alive under provisions of the Delrio Constitutional Law to be merged in a smaller number of union of provinces.

Former provinces

Historical abolished provinces
Province of Aosta (Italian: Provincia di Aosta) (1927–1945). Became the Autonomous Region of Aosta Valley in 1948.
Province of Terra di Lavoro (Italian: Provincia di Terra di Lavoro) (1861–1927). It was divided into the current provinces of Frosinone, Latina and Caserta.

Provinces of Istria, Kvarner and Dalmatia
Province of Zara (Italian: Provincia di Zara) (1923–1947). Created after World War I in Dalmatia. Originally a small territory, it was greatly enlarged in 1941 during World War II. It was a part of the Governorship of Dalmatia. It remained nominally a part of the Italian Social Republic after the Italian capitulation.
Province of Pola (Italian: Provincia di Pola) (1923–1947). Created after World War I in Istria. It was occupied by Germany in September 1943 and it was administered as a part of the German Operational Zone of the Adriatic Littoral.
Province of Fiume (Italian: Provincia di Fiume) (1924–1947). Created after World War I in Kvarner. Enlarged during World War II. It was occupied by Germany in September 1943 and it was administered as a part of the German Operational Zone of the Adriatic Littoral.

Provinces established during World War II

Province of Ljubljana (Italian: Provincia di Lubiana) (1941–1943). Created during World War II. It was occupied by Germany in September 1943 and it was administered as a part of the German Operation Zone of the Adriatic Littoral.
Province of Spalato (Italian: Provincia di Spalato) (1941–1943). Created during World War II. It was a part of the Governorship of Dalmatia. It was occupied by Germany in September 1943 and later annexed by the Independent State of Croatia.
Province of Cattaro (Italian: Provincia di Cattaro) (1941–1943). Created during World War II. It was a part of the Governorship of Dalmatia. It was occupied by Germany in September 1943 and partially annexed by the Independent State of Croatia.

Colonial provinces

Province of Rhodes (Italian: Provincia di Rodi) (1923–1947) or Italian Aegean Islands (Italian: Isole italiane dell'Egeo). It remained nominally a part of the Italian Social Republic after the Italian capitulation.
Italian Libya was divided into four provinces and one territory (Southern Military Territory or Territory of Saharan Libya). From 1939 onward the provinces were a part of metropolitan Italy.
Province of Tripoli (Italian: Provincia di Tripoli) (1937–1943).
Province of Misurata (Italian: Provincia di Misurata) (1937–1943).
Province of Benghazi (Italian: Provincia di Bengasi) (1937–1943).
Province of Derna (Italian: Provincia di Derna) (1937–1943).

Theoretical provinces

 Province of the Western Alps (Italian: Provincia delle Alpi Occidentali). Planned World War II province to be created of the Italian-annexed French territories of the Alpes Maritimes (including the Principality of Monaco) and parts of Alpes-de-Haute-Provence, Hautes Alpes and Savoie. The town of Briançon (Italian: Brianzone) was to act as the provincial capital.
 Province of Corsica (Italian: Provincia della Corsica). Planned to be created after World War II Axis powers victory, with Petru Giovacchini as possible "Governor".
 Province of Ragusa in Dalmatia (Italian: Provincia di Ragusa di Dalmazia). Planned World War II province to be created of the Italian-annexed Dalmatian territories that were areas of the ancient Republic of Ragusa.
 Provinces in islands of Greece: Provincia delle Ionie; Provincia delle Cicladi; Provincia di Samo. Planned World War II provinces to be created of the Italian-annexed islands of Greece (Ionian Islands, Cyclades and Samos).

Controversies

Provinces are often deemed useless, and many proposals have been made in recent years to eliminate them.
However, the difficulty of changing the constitution and the opposition of groups of politicians and citizens halted any proposal of reform.

In 2013, during his speech to the Chamber of Deputies, newly appointed Prime Minister Enrico Letta announced that a revision of the second part of the constitution was needed, in order to change the bicameral parliamentary system and to abolish the provinces. The proposal, presented during the Renzi premiership, was rejected in the constitutional referendum held in December 2016.

See also

ISO 3166-2:IT
Regions of Italy
Metropolitan cities of Italy
Municipalities of Italy

Notes

References

External links

 
Subdivisions of Italy
Provinces
Italy 2
Provinces, Italy
NUTS 2 statistical regions of the European Union